Christ Church with St Ewen is a Church of England parish church in Broad Street, Bristol, England.

Christ Church was built between 1786 and 1791. The tower appears to have been designed by Thomas Paty who was architect to the vestry, and the body of the church by his son William, and built by Thomas Paty and Sons, replacing a medieval one. The entrance and refurbished interior are by Henry Williams in 1883. The building was restored by Priest-in-charge Rev. G. S. Zimmern in 1973.

On the tower quarter-boy figures strike the quarter hours on the Automaton clock.

It has been designated as a Grade II* listed building.

St Ewen's Church
St Ewen's church was on the north west corner of the medieval cross-roads, opposite Christ Church on Broad Street. A charter of Archbishop Theobald of Canterbury, confirming a vicar called Turstin at the church and threatening that anyone who interfered with the post would be “firmly bound up in the chains of anathema”, is known as the Charter of Theobald or the Curse of St Ewen. It dates to about 1141 and is the oldest document held by Bristol Archives. The church was founded in the early 1100s. In 1639, Matthew Hazzard, was appointed vicar of St Ewin's, Bristol. His wife Dorothy Hazzard would allow pregnant women to reside at the parsonage (when they should have been at church) and they also gave homes to families en route to America. The parish was joined with that of Christ Church in 1790. The church was demolished in 1820 to make space for the enlargement of the old Council House, now Bristol Register Office.

Building

The current Baroque style building, of Bath stone, was designed by William Paty and built between 1786 and 1791. A Victorian restoration was carried out in 1883 by Henry Williams.

Worship
Worship at Christ Church follows the 1662 Book of Common Prayer and the parish supports the work of the Prayer Book Society in promoting the use of traditional liturgy throughout the Church of England. Scripture readings are taken from the Authorised Version of the Bible. The Parochial Church Council has passed Resolutions A, B and C and does not accept the ministry of women priests.

See also
 Churches in Bristol
 Dorothy Hazard, wife of a Puritan preacher named Matthew Hazard
 Grade II* listed buildings in Bristol

References

External links 

 Christ Church on ChurchCrawler
 St Ewen's Church on ChurchCrawler

Churches completed in 1791
Christ Church with St Ewen
Christ Church with St Ewen
Georgian architecture in Bristol
Grade II* listed churches in Bristol
18th-century Church of England church buildings
Church of England churches receiving AEO